The 2016 Badminton Asia Junior Championships is the 19th edition of the Asia continental junior championships to crown the best U-19 badminton players across Asia. This tournament was held in Bangkok, Thailand, between 9 and 17 July 2016. The championships consists of mixed team and individual events. There were 19 countries with over 250 players participating in this edition.

Venue
This tournament was held at CPB Badminton and Sports Science Training Center.

Seed
The defending champion, China, was the top seeds in the mixed team event followed by Thailand and Indonesia. In the individual event, The host country Thai boys' Kantaphon Wangcharoen, and girls' Pornpawee Chochuwong were the top seeds. China's pairs He Jiting / Tan Qiang and He Jiting / Du Yue were the top seeding in the boys' and mixed doubles respectively, while the girls' doubles goes to Indonesian pair Apriani Rahayu and Jauza Fadhila Sugiarto.

 Mixed team

 
 
 
 
 
 
 
 

 Boys' singles

 Kantaphon Wangcharoen
 Chirag Sen
 Koki Watanabe
 Lee Zii Jia
 Pachaarapol Nipornram
 Korakrit Laotrakul
 Lee Chia-hao
 Sun Feixiang

 Girls' singles

 Pornpawee Chochuwong
 Goh Jin Wei
 Chen Yufei
 Gregoria Mariska
 Natsuki Nidaira
 Kim Ga-eun
 Gao Fangjie
 Pattarasuda Chaiwan

 Boys' doubles

 He Jiting / Tan Qiang
 Pakin Kuna-Anuvit / Natthapat Trinkajee
 Han Chengkai / Zhou Haodong
 Andika Ramadiansyah / Rinov Rivaldy
 Warit Sarapat / Panachai Worasaktyanan
 Ooi Zi Heng / Soh Wooi Yik
 Krishna Prasad Garaga / Dhruv Kapila
 Fan Qiuyue / Ren Xiangyu

 Girls' doubles

 Apriani Rahayu / Jauza Fadhila Sugiarto
 Ng Tsz Yau / Yeung Nga Ting
 Du Yue / Xu Ya
 Mychelle Crhystine Bandaso / Serena Kani

 Mixed doubles

 He Jiting / Du Yue
 Pakin Kuna-Anuvit / Kwanchanok Sudjaipraparat
 Rinov Rivaldy / Apriani Rahayu
 Pachaarapol Nipornram / Ruethaichanok Laisuan

Medalists
In the mixed team event, China retain the title for the fourth consecutive time. China also made a clean sweep of all the individual titles.

Medal table

References

External links
Team Event at Tournamentsoftware.com
Individual Event at Tournamentsoftware.com

 
Asia Championships, Junior
 in youth sport
Badminton, Asia Championships, Junior
 in Asian sport
Badminton, Asia Championships, Junior
Asia Championships, Junior
Asia Championships, Junior
Badminton Asia Junior Championships
Badminton, Asia Championships, Junior